Medinospila is a genus of tachinid flies in the family Tachinidae from Madagascar.

Species
Medinospila nigella Mesnil, 1977

Distribution
Madagascar

References

Exoristinae
Endemic fauna of Madagascar
Diptera of Africa
Tachinidae genera